Thung Bua Halt Railway Station is a railway station on the Suphanburi Line located in Tambon Rang Pikul, Amphoe Kamphaeng Saen, Nakhon Pathom Province, Thailand. There is only one platform, on the west side of the track. The station is now operational and there are two trains stop at it.

Thung Bua was opened on September 3, 1984. It is the nearest station of Kasetsart University Kamphaengsaen Campus.

References

External links
 Rotfaithai Dot Com 

Railway stations in Thailand